The Tarnobrzeg Voivodeship was a unit of administrative division and local government in Poland in years 1975-1998, superseded in parts by Subcarpathian Voivodeship, Świętokrzyskie Voivodeship and Lublin Voivodeship. Its capital city was Tarnobrzeg, albeit the major city in the region was Stalowa Wola.

The main rivers were the Vistula and the San.

The region was represented in football by the local giant teams of Stal Stalowa Wola and Siarka Tarnobrzeg.

Major cities and towns (population in 1998)
 Stalowa Wola (71,814)
 Tarnobrzeg (51,061)
 Sandomierz (27,409)
 Staszów (17,015)
 Nisko (15,722)

Transport

Road transport
  Radom – Ostrowiec Świętokrzyski – Tarnobrzeg Voivodeship border – Sadowie – Opatów – Lipnik – Łoniów – Tarnobrzeg – Nowa Dęba – Majdan Królewski – Tarnobrzeg Voivodeship border – Rzeszów

  Kuźnica Białostocka – Białystok – Lublin – Kraśnik – Tarnobrzeg Voivodeship border – Modliborzyce – Janów Lubelski – Nisko – Jeżowe – Tarnobrzeg Voivodeship border – Rzeszów – Barwinek

  Walichnowy – Piotrków Trybunalski – Kielce – Tarnobrzeg Voivodeship border – Baćkowice – Opatów – Annopol – Gościeradów – Olbięcin – Tarnobrzeg Voivodeship border – Kraśnik – Tarnobrzeg Voivodeship border – Modliborzyce – Janów Lubelski – Dzwola – Tarnobrzeg Voivodeship border – Zamość – Zosin

  Lipnik – Sandomierz – Stalowa Wola – Nisko – Rudnik nad Sanem – Kopki – Tarnobrzeg Voivodeship border – Jarosław – Przemyśl

  Bytom – Katowice – Kraków – Tarnobrzeg Voivodeship border – Łubnice – Połaniec – Osiek – Łoniów – Sandomierz – Ożarów – Tarłów – Czekarzewice – Tarnobrzeg Voivodeship border – Warsaw

See also
 Voivodeships of Poland

References

Former voivodeships of Poland (1975–1998)
History of Lublin Voivodeship
History of Podkarpackie Voivodeship
History of Świętokrzyskie Voivodeship